Abraham "Babe" Scheuer (January 2, 1913 – March 13, 1997) was an American football tackle who played one season with the New York Giants of the National Football League (NFL). He played college football at New York University and attended James Madison High School in Brooklyn, New York.

References

External links
Just Sports Stats

1913 births
1997 deaths
American football tackles
NYU Violets football players
New York Giants players
Sportspeople from the Bronx
Players of American football from New York City
James Madison High School (Brooklyn) alumni